Pac-Man and the Ghostly Adventures, also known in Japan as  is a computer-animated television series produced by 41 Entertainment, Arad Productions, a partnership between Sprite Animation Studios and OLM, Inc., and Bandai Namco Entertainment for Tokyo MX (stereo version), BS11 (stereo version) and Disney XD (bilingual version). Based on Bandai Namco's Pac-Man video game franchise, it is the second animated series to be based upon the game franchise, following the 1982 TV series. The show aired from June 15, 2013, to May 25, 2015, running for two seasons and 52 episodes.

Various games and merchandise were produced based on the series, including two video games and several mobile apps.

Production 
A pilot trailer produced by Arad Productions was shown at E3 2010, alongside the announcement of Pac-Man Party for the Wii. The pilot explained the basic plot of the show, and visually was mostly identical to the final product. The end of the pilot features a homage to the "Coffee Break" scenes in the original arcade game. Avi Arad explained in an interview that they made Pac-Man a high-schooler in order to tell stories about being a teenager, and that they also wanted to explore Pac-Man and Pac-Land's backstory. The trailer and Pac-Man Party also debuted a new design for Pac-Man that would be used for most Pac-Man media and merchandise during the show's run.

In September 2011, 41 Entertainment was named worldwide distributor of the series except in Japan, where Bandai Namco would handle distribution. The series was titutively titled PAC-MAN 3D at the time. Avi Arad said in the press release that Pac-Man was one of his all-time favorite characters, and that the show's ghosts would come in all shapes and sizes. Following this announcement, 41 Entertainment would announce global distribution deals with various partners. The animation was done by Sprite Animation Studios in partnership with OLM, Inc., who handled the production process, from storyboard to delivery. While Arad came up with the basic plot-line for the show, the final product was directed by Motonori Sakakibara.

In some territories, the second half of season 2 was distributed as season 3.

The show ended on a cliffhanger in 2015, with 52 episodes produced in total.

Overview 
The series takes place on the planet known as Pac-World, and its Netherworld. The show sees Pac-Man and his best friends Spiral and Cylindria attend Maze School, a boarding school located within the city of Pacopolis. They help to protect citizens from the threat of ghosts after the seal that locked up the Netherworld was accidentally opened by Pac at the time he was avoiding the school bully Skeebo. Ghosts are able to possess Pac-Worlder bodies although only for a time limit of a few minutes unless aided by Dr. Buttocks technology. Victims of possession usually are apparent by a red-eyed glow although this too can be prevented with Buttocks technology.

Pac-Man also has four friendly ghosts (Blinky, Pinky, Inky and Clyde) that surrendered and vowed to help him along his voyage (in exchange for being restored to the living world). Pac-Man vows to stop Betrayus and the ghosts (or any other bad guy) from taking over Pac-World while searching for his long-lost parents. He has the unique ability to eat ghosts and destroy the ectoplasm that makes up most of their bodies. Only their eyeballs survive, which he spits out. They reform their bodies using a regeneration chamber. The ghosts continually attack the city to locate the Repository, a storage chamber for the corporeal bodies of the ghosts which would allow them to live again if they possessed them. It is kept hidden to deny them this freedom and only President Spheros and Pac-Man are aware of its location. The ghosts also attack the Tree of Life to prevent Pac-Man from gaining powers to fight them. Without the power-berries, Pac-Man is not able to fly, or breathe in the Netherworld.

Cast

Main 
 , nickname "Pac", (voiced by Erin Mathews) is the 13-14 year old title character of the series. He is described by some as the last of the yellow Pac-People on Pac-World. Pac's father Zac helped in the war against Commander Betrayus. Pac is a teenager between 3'5"-4'0" tall that just found out that it's his destiny to defeat the Ghosts and send Betrayus back to the Netherworld permanently. He feels lonely because he's the only Yellow One in Pac-World and he misses his parents very badly and is determined to find them no matter what, but sometimes gets too carried away when doing so since this would lead him to bigger problems or would usually leave him less time with his friends. He's guilt-ridden because he unleashed the ghost by accident. However, the president and his friends tell Pac to get over his guilt and protect Pac-World from evil. He can eat ghosts just like the legendary Yellow Ones did back in ancient times and also has a giant appetite that may sometimes lead to trouble since he can eat anything, even things that aren't food. With the power of the berries (which are similar to Power Pellets) from the Tree of Life, he gains helpful abilities like withstanding the Netherworld's environment with the Power Berry, being able to fly upon eating the Flying Berry, breathe ice with the Minty Ice Berry, breathe fire with the Minty Fiery Berry, become cybernetic with a drill and magnet upon eating the Titanium Berry, gain a chameleon-like body upon eating the Chameleon Berry, etc. Pac is also the strongest and fastest of his species alive. With the help of his friends, Sir Cumference and the Ghost Gang (Blinky, Inky, Pinky, and Clyde), he's ready for action. Pac vows to stop Betrayus and the ghosts. Pac has had a temporary truce with Betrayus like when it came to the Ghosteroid, the Pointy Heads, and when the ghosts go missing.
  (voiced by Andrea Libman) is a 13-14 year old pink Pac-Girl with glasses who is over 3'5" tall, over 4'0" including hair. She is a teenager who celebrates her birthday in the second season. She is tomboyish and the brains of the team, often aiding her friends Pac-Man and Spiralton. She also has trouble trusting ghosts. Pinky, who has a crush on Pac, views her as a rival, thinking Cyli also has a crush on him, although she gets highly annoyed and shown to be jealous almost every time Pinky openly flirts with Pac, another time Cyli said Pac was cute after eating a power berry that made him smart and changed his mannerisms she even told Pac she loves him at the same time as Pinky, hinting that she might have a crush on Pac. Pinky mocks her nickname, calling her "Silly" instead.
  (voiced by Samuel Vincent) is a big red 16-17 year old teen Pac-Boy over 4'5" tall (and over 5'0" including hair) and Pac-Man's best friend and roommate who is nicknamed "Spiral". He and Pac share similar crazy personalities. Spiral loves to blow things up and he's interested in the history of Pac-World. He and Inky have the same observant-brainy trait, but Spiral isn't as serious. He refers to Pac as "Pacster".
 The Ghost Gang is a group of four ghosts from the original arcade game. Though they live in the Netherworld and are ruled by Lord Betrayus, they pretend to be dumb and useless to Betrayus as they are actually good-natured spirits and secretly help Pac-Man in hopes that they can be redeemed enough to live again.
 Blinky (voiced by Ian James Corlett) is a red ghost, the second shortest and oldest of the Ghost Gang Siblings. He's the default leader of the group, which differs greatly from his 1980s scaredy-cat counterpart. Also, he's crafty and can't always be trusted. He might act mean, but he deeply cares about his friends and his siblings; however, he might only be helping the Pacs because he likes to stay on the winning team. In the episode "The Pac Be with You", it is revealed that he's a Pac-Fu master and has presumably fought against Master Goo alongside other Pac-Fu masters during the ghost wars. Pac dubs his World of Odd counterpart who resembles Cowardly Lion as Uncle Ghost.
 Inky (voiced by Lee Tockar) is a blue ghost, the second oldest and second tallest in the Ghost Gang Siblings. He and Blinky are close pals, though they fight sometimes. Although he is the smartest and most sarcastic of the four, he is easily distracted and lacks focus most of the time, with Blinky saying that Inky can "get lost in a thought". He has a habit of snorting when he laughs sometimes and can multiply. Even though he helps the Ghost Gang undermine Betrayus' schemes, he has differed with Pinky on prioritizing Pac-Man's interests over their own. Pac dubs his World of Odd counterpart who resembles the Tin Woodman as Papa Ghost.
 Pinky (voiced by Ashleigh Ball) is a pink ghost, the only sister, the second youngest and smallest in the Ghost Gang Siblings. She is described as sweet, girly and "a bad", but not a really bad guy" She has a crush on Pac-Man (like in Pac-Man World 2), and even got to kiss him. She has a rivalry with Cylindria because they got off on the wrong foot, thinking she might also have a crush on Pac. Despite the gang's fear of Betrayus, Pinky is often the sole member of the gang who is willing to go out of her way to help Pac in the more risky situations. She is also the first to side with Pac even when the odds are more in Betrayus' favor. In the episode "Stand By Your Pac-Man", she revealed that she can transform into a pink cyclops ghost and she assumed this form in three other episodes in the second season. Pinky can be scatterbrained and naive at times. She often argues with her brothers, but loves them nonetheless. She has expressed a desire to get her original body back from the repository, but prioritizes Pac-Man's interests instead. Pac dubs her World of Odd counterpart who resembles Dorothy Gale as Mama Ghost.
 Clyde (voiced by Brian Drummond) is an orange ghost, the youngest and largest in the siblings. He is the most caring member of the group, and although he often seems like a dim-witted ditz, he often comes up with pearls of great wisdom. Clyde has a soft side for soft and sweet things like Fuzbitz. Blinky gets annoyed with this. Clyde and Pac-Man also share the same characteristics when it comes to eating. Clyde is the peacekeeper of the Ghost Gang as well as the moral compass in helping Pac and his friends, although he is not above clanging heads together when necessary as Inky and Blinky have discovered. He can also speak nine languages, including monster and he can split into two halves just for fun or whenever he's unhappy. Pac dubs his World of Odd counterpart who resembles Scarecrow as Baby Ghost. As well as Blinky, he totally differs from his Hanna-Barbera series' counterpart, where he is the leader of the group and the cleverest member, being second only to the ghosts' evil leader Mezmeron. His middle name is Filbert.
 , full name Lord Betrayus Sneakerus Spheros, (voiced by Sam Vincent) is the Lord of the Ghosts and the Netherworld. He has always been President Spheros' younger brother and the son of Rotunda. He really hates his older brother. Back when he was a commander, Betrayus once led a massive revolt against Pac-World in a plot to take over Pac-World (later named Pac-War 1). During this revolt and despite the fact that he had Ghosts serving him and the fact that he was well-armed, he was defeated. As punishment for his crimes, he was unusually stripped of his corporeal form (his body) and then he was banished to the Netherworld. Since then, he has been waiting and plotting for the day when he can gain steal the Tree of Life and obtain the Repository so that he can regain his corporal form. He is the most powerful fire ghost with his fiery claw hands. Unlike the other ghosts, he's white with red eyes. Betrayus makes all his Ghosts and Monsters of the Netherworld do all the hard work while he watches the action from his TV (the channels provided by "slug-cam"). He has vowed to defeat Pac-Man while plotting to steal the Power Berries and has been shown to make a temporary truce with Pac when it came to the threat of the Ghosteroid, the threat of the Pointy Heads, and whenever his ghosts go missing.

Pac-Worlders 

  (voiced by Sam Vincent) is the President of Pac-World, a son of Rotunda, and the older brother of Betrayus. He is over 4'5" tall. He wants Pac-Man and his friends to behave and stop his evil brother. He's easily annoyed with his security and staff constantly messing up and jumping on him for protection. He is a good friend to Pac-Man's parents and also really hates his younger brother.
  (voiced by Ian James Corlett) is a goofy scientist who has personally met Pac's father and mother. He is over 4'5" tall. Sir Cumference has crazy inventions that has helped Pac-Man and his friends on occasion. Sir C is in charge of the repository and knows the Tree of Life. He has a rivalry with Dr. Buttocks and is also a friend of Pac's parents. He is also a detective.
  (voiced by Matt Hill) is a blue pompous and foolish jock and school bully that often picks on Pac-Man for fun. He used to be Cylindria's steady boyfriend until he was too scared to save her from a Cyclops Ghost and chose to break up with her when Spiral confronted him about his cowardice. Pac ends up saving Cyli, and Skeebo is often jealous of Pac saving the day. He hates the color yellow, but ironically, he is blonde. He once had his mouth removed. What he lacks in people skills, he makes up for with a very beautiful tenor singing voice that makes Pac-People start crying in sadness and attracts all kinds of birds, he is always afraid of ghosts, especially The Ghost Gang.
 Spheria Suprema (voiced by Ashleigh Ball) is an orange Pac-Person who happens to be Pac-Man's aunt. She is the Pac-Pong champ where she had once defeated Betrayus sometime before he led his revolt against Pac-World and is admired by Cyli. She has a Pac-Dog named Uggles.
  (voiced by Erin Mathews) is one of Pac-Man's teachers. She has a Pac-Dog named Foofie.
 Mr. Strictler (voiced by Mark Oliver) is a light-blue driver's ed teacher and authority figure with a stubborn personality who only appears in "Driver's Pac". He is Sherry's father. Mr. Strictler would often fail the least worthy of his students with his own daughter being one of them. When it came to Pac-Man, Mr. Strictler started writing down Pac-Man's driving violations up to the point where he was unknowingly dragged into Pac-Man's mission in the Netherworld to stop Dr. Buttocks from using a drill to bring Pacopolis into the Netherworld. Afterwards, Spheria finally forced him to be nice and reasonable. While he doesn't give Pac his license, Mr. Strictler allows him to take the test again. He also made cameo appearances in "Cave Pac-Man", "Cosmic Contest", and "Santa Pac".
 Mr. Dome (voiced by Lee Tockar) is the gym teacher who taught Pac-Man and some students to be athletic in Phys Ed.
 O'Drool is the Secretary of Security who first appeared in "Betrayus Turns Up the Heat". He is quite mean and blames Sir C for the cause of the heat which was actually made by Dr. Buttocks. After Dr. Buttocks' plot was thwarted by Pac-Man, O'Drool was fired by President Spheros for his arrogance and was taken away by the security. He later made cameo appearances in "Invasion of the Pointy Heads" and a few other episodes in the second season.
 Kingpin Obtuse (voiced by Lee Tockar) is a dark-green crime lord of Pac-World's criminal underworld. He was paid by Lord Betrayus where he tricked Skeebo into stealing Pac-Man's Super Power Berries. In "Peace Without Slime" and "The Ghost Behind the Throne", he was assigned by Betrayus yet again to be Pacopolis's "Puppet Governor" as their attempt to take over Pac-World as a result.
 Rotunda (voiced by Tabitha St. Germain) is a trigger-happy Elder who is the mother of both Stratos and Betrayus. Rotunda idolizes Pac-Man and decides to become his grandmother, much to the dismay of her two sons. Betrayus possessed her and used her body to him from being found out and had the President hypnotized into a Kindergartener Lunatic which would work out to his attempt to get the repository with original body. This backfired when they took the wrong direction to the repository area by the disillusioned Stratos. When Rotunda was back to herself, she strictly sends Betrayus back to his current home in the Netherworld. Betrayus ends up doing what his mother says. Rotunda also made a cameo appearance in "Cosmic Contest".
 Zac is Pac's father. He was a skilled war operative. During Betrayus's revolt, he went missing and was presumed dead along with his wife Sunny, that led Pac to be orphaned (as the public thought). But later after Pac (who is known as Pacopolis's protector, "Pac-Man") beaten Apex twice, the evil pointy-head lord reveals he met Zac and is still alive with his wife on the pointy-head planet. Some Pac-Worlders think he died during the revolt, but Pac-Man and his friends (including Sir C) know he is still alive.
 Sunny is Pac's mother. During the revolt of Betrayus, she disappeared and was presumed dead along with her husband, that led Pac to be orphaned (or so the public thought). She appears in the episode "Pac to the Future" and also "Happy Holidays and a Merry Berry Day" with her husband.
 The Pacinator (voiced by Ian James Corlett impersonating Arnold Schwarzenegger) is a villainous Pac-Person that was responsible for freezing and killing most of the Yellow Ones. He made his first appearance in "Stand By Your Pac-Man" as well as making a cameo appearance in "Shadow of the Were-Pac" as a party guest. Pac-Man gets personal with him because of what he did with the other Yellow Ones. The Pacinator was hired to do this by a villain he thinks is more dangerous than Betrayus. It was presumed that he was hired by Apex.
 Do-Ug (voiced by Gabe Khouth) is a Neander-Pac kid who first appeared in "Cave Pac-Man". One of Dr. Buttocks' plots ended up thawing Do-Ug from the ice that he was frozen in. He has a crush on Cylindria and is revealed to be an orphan. Due to Spiral's idiotic and careless antics, Do-Ug was hunted by several scientists. Luckily Pac and his friends managed to take him back to his home and timeline where the Pac-a-Chini was stolen. When they found the tribe's village, they tried to ask Do-ug to get it back. However, Do-ug admits that he is only a simple cave boy with no role in the tribe as such he is unable to do anything. After Pac-Man fought off a pack of Pacasaurs using his fire berry, the tribe decides to give the trio back the Pac-a-Chini. Before leaving, Pac-Man gives Do-ug the gift of fire and declares him "Keeper of the Flame", thus giving Do-ug a role within the tribe and becomes the first Neander-Pac to wield fire. The group then bids farewell to Do-ug before heading back to their own time. He also made cameo costume appearances in "The Shadow of the Were-Pac".
 Danny Vaincori (voiced by Kyle Rideout) is a movie director who first appears in "Pac-Mania". He plans to create a TV show about Pac and his friends using look-alikes of them, but goes too far and made Pac and his friends look like fools and later he gets really annoyed when Pac accidentally ruins his movie sets when he mistakes a cyclops ghost prop for a real cyclops ghost. He was later possessed as part of Betrayus's plan to use his TV show as a cover-up to sneak into Pac-World and steal the Tree of Life using costumes and props as disguises (not counting the look-alikes of Pac and his friends).
 Elliptika "Elli" (voiced by Kazumi Evans) is a light pink Pac-Worlder who visits Pacopolis from PacTokyo. She is the niece of President Spheros and Betrayus and the grandniece of Rotunda who makes her debut in "New Girl in Town". In the same episode, she said she remembers Pac's parents and where he might be able to find them. Elli and Pac share a mutual relationship, which nearly came to an end when she was possessed by Mavis and Pinky.
 Moondog is a black-haired lavender Pac-Worlder who is Cylindria's father. He is a hippie and a gypsy who owns the family bus as a current home for them.
 Starchild is a blonde Pac-Worlder who is Cylindria's mother. Like her husband Moondog, she is a hippie and a gypsy, and she still lives in the family bus after her husband gave the family treehouse to a horde of squirrels.
 Grannie (voiced by Tabitha St. Germain) is a healthy elderly pink Pac-Worlder who is Starchild's mother and Cylindria's grandmother. Like Cylindria's parents, she is a hippie and a gypsy, and still lives in her son-in-law's family bus. She is usually seen with a family album, but it's quite possible that she's a bit unaware that she is embarrassing her granddaughter in front of Pac-Man and Spiral.
 Santa Pac (voiced by Richard Newman) is Pac-World's version of Santa Claus who has skilled magic and fighting abilities and first appears in "Santa Pac". Betrayus kidnaps him to stop Berry Day from coming but this attempt fails. Pac-Man later rescues him and restores the holiday.

Ghosts 
 Butt-ler (voiced by Brian Drummond) is Betrayus' servant and butler. He is a purple Ghost with a butt-shaped head who wears a bowler hat and speaks with a British accent. During the Pac-War, he was known as Corporal Heineyhead and worked as a spy for Betrayus. He hates his older twin brother, Dr. Buttocks, even when he's pleasing his master. According to him, their mother hated them both, but she hated Buttocks even more. He and Pac-Man seem to be frenemies.
 Dr. A.H. Buttocks (voiced by Brian Drummond) is the Netherworld's greatest mad scientist and Butt-ler's older twin brother who also has a butt-shaped head, but is light blue, has a cybernetic right hand, wears glasses and speaks with a German accent. He specializes in monster experimentation in hopes of achieving Pac-World domination. He sometimes suspects that the Ghost Gang are working with Pac-Man, but has had no luck convincing Betrayus of this since he usually blames him or his brother for his failures and sometimes tortures him for fun. He wants all of the workers to get out of his way. He sometimes hates his twin brother and has a rivalry with Sir Cumference. He was at the top of the class at Pac World U.
 Glooky is a green Ghost with a squint in his left eye. He is a friend of Blinky.
 Mavis is an orange female Ghost.
 Specter (voiced by Brendan Ryan Barrett) is a ghost spy who works for Betrayus ordered to get the repository and is a lot stronger and smarter than the other ghosts since he was the first to never get eaten by Pac. Dr. Buttocks has shown some jealousy to him. He easily outsmarts Pac by possessing Uggles and other Pac people, including his friends, Spiral and Cylindria. He was actually revealed to be a traitor and wanted to rule both Pac-World and the Netherworld but got ended up exposed as a liar and a traitorous outlaw thanks to a trick done by Pac-Man, Cylindria, Spiral, the Ghost Gang (who used a slug named Larry), and a silent partner in Dr. Buttocks (who built the fake repository). Betrayus ends up having Specter placed in the deepest bowels of the Netherworld. He made a surprising appearance in "New Girl in Town" as a host for a contest. It could be possible he is doing this as both community service and a punishment for his attempt to rule Pac-World and the Netherworld. His third appearance is in "Santa Pac" where he tries to cheer up Betrayus, but fails.
 Fred is a white ghost that was used as a flag due to the lack of white clothes.
 Master Goo (voiced by Vincent Tong) is a calm but cocky Ninja Ghost who is a Master of Pac-Fu (the Pac-World version of kung fu). During Betrayus's deadly revolt, he discovered the dark side of Pac-Fu but was defeated by the Good Pac-Fu Masters. Years later, he became a Martial Arts Coach for Betrayus's Ghost Forces. He seems to be even stronger than Specter. With help from Blinky, Pac-Man managed to use the Pac-Fu skills he learned to defeat Master Goo after they failed to defeat him during their first encounter.
 Captain Banshee is a ghost pirate who first appears in "Cap'n Banshee and his Interstellar Buccaneers". He doesn't seem to live in the Netherworld and always sails in the sky and in space. He has a little green Pac-Dragon that behaves like a parrot.
 Cyclops Ghosts (voiced by Lee Tockar) are heavyset Ghosts with one eye and three horns. These ghosts are a bit like thugs.
 Ogle (voiced by Brian Drummond) is a Cyclops Ghost who works as a chef at his restaurant. He cooked the food for his friends, the Ghost Gang, Betrayus, Butt-ler, and Dr. Buttocks. In "No Body Knows", it is revealed that Ogle used to be a Pac-Person.
 Fire Ghosts are orange Ghosts who can emit fire from their body. Pac-Man can only eat them if he has ice powers.
 Ice Ghosts are blue Ghosts who can emit ice from their body. They first appeared in "A Berry Scary Night".
 Tentacle Ghosts (voiced by Lee Tockar) are 4-eyed purple-black Ghosts who look similar to an octopus.
 Guardian Ghosts are large Ghosts who guard the Netherworld. They seem to wear metal masks, have glowing cyan-blue eyes, and usually carry a staff.
 Aqua Ghosts are light blue Ghosts with fins on their head. They first appeared in the episode "Heebo-Skeebo".
 Drill-Bit Ghosts are Ghosts that have drill bits on their heads. They are always frightened.
 Alien Ghosts are Ghosts that live on the Ghosteroid.
 Ghosteroid is an asteroid ghost that Dr. Buttocks once brought near Pac-World. It proved to be much of a threat so Betrayus sends the Ghost Gang to help Pac-Man get rid of it. More of them later appeared in "Cosmic Contest" and "Cap'n Banshee and his Interstellar Buccaneers".
 Ghost Sharks are ghostly sharks that reside in the waters of PacLantis and guard the Berry of Youth. They first appeared in "PacLantis" where one Ghost Shark ate the Berry of Youth and was revived as a Pac-Fish after they fought against Pac and his friends, the Ghost Gang, and Betrayus, Butt-ler, and Buttocks. More Ghost Sharks also appeared in "Cosmic Contest" and "Cap'n Banshee and his Interstellar Buccaneers".
 Virus Ghosts are normal ghosts that have been digitised by a Dr. Buttocks invention. They have the power to infect or control electronic devices and can travel through computer networks.

Pointy Heads 
 Apex (voiced by Colin Murdock) is an evil strange mysterious overlord who used a ruse to come in peace to Pac-World so that he can take over it and he might have been the one who hired the Pacinator to help him. He has a habit of cracking jokes. During his ruse, he demonstrated abilities that outdid Pac-Man. When Apex's motives have been revealed, Pac-Man ends up fighting Apex and defeats him with his bad singing. Before retreating from Pac-World, Apex jokes that he's Pac-Man's father Zac and reveals that he had met him at some point, but won't tell how. In "Invasion of the Pointy Heads", Apex returns and strikes a deal with Betrayus to take over Pac-World. He eventually turned against Betrayus in order to further his goals and revealed that he was using him all this time. Apex and his fleet were repelled when Betrayus and his Ghosts allowed themselves to be eaten by Pac-Man since the Pointy-heads can't stand belched eyeballs. Before Apex joins in the retreat, he hints that he has Pac-Man's parents in his planet. In "Cosmic Contest", he and Tip participate in a race against Pac-Man, Spiral, Betrayus, and Buttocks.
 Professor Pointybrains (voiced by Brian Drummond) is a scientist who assists Apex and seems to be just as smart as Sir Cumference and Dr. Buttocks.
 Tip (voiced by Gabe Khouth) is a strong minion who first appears in "Cosmic Contest". He became both friends and rivals with Pac-Man during the race.

Robots 
 Grinder is a lab assistant Sir Cumference made for himself. Sometimes, he and Sir Cumference hate each other and he's usually bothered by Fuzbitz.
 Grindette is Grinder's wife who first appeared in "The Bride of Grinder". After Grinder's failed attempt to make her, Buttocks controlled her with a mind control chip in order to have her search for the repository and the Tree of Life, but she was able to overcome it and remove the chip. Afterwards, she and Grinder became a couple.
 Grinder-Tron is a giant robot made by Dr. Buttocks that resembles an evil version of Grinder. It's the first boss in the video game Pac-Man and the Ghostly Adventures 2.
 Mega-Grinder is a giant robot build by Pac-Man (under the effect of a Brain Berry) which resembles Grinder. It is used to fight Grinder-Tron.
 Computer Bug is a small antivirus bug that helps Pac-Man rid the computer systems of the evil virus ghosts.
 Pac-Topus is a giant mechanical octopus that only appears in "Ride the Wild Pac-Topus". It was originally an amusement park ride until it was brought to life by Dr. Buttocks's mind controlling chip, but proves uncontrollable. It is the second boss in Pac-Man and the Ghostly Adventures 2, having somehow came back to life and has escaped to Paclantis.
 Cyber-Mouse is a giant digital mouse-like creature that Pac-Man, Pinky, and Clyde encounter in the computer network.
 Cyber-Fluffy is a digital vision of Fluffy that Pac-Man, Pinky, and Clyde encounter in the computer network after they defeat the Cyber-Mouse.

Others 
 Madame Ghoulasha (voiced by Kathleen Barr) is a warty Nether-witch from the Netherworld who first appeared in "Jinxed". She has a crush on Betrayus and offered to put a jinx on Pac-Man in exchange for him marrying her, but he refused and Buttocks ends up as her groom. She also made cameo appearances in "Shadow of the Were-Pac" and "Pac's Very Scary Halloween".
 Count Pacula (voiced by Samuel Vincent) is a villainous vam-pac from the Netherworld with an appearance that resembles a Pac-Person. Count Pacula can only be summoned when two moons turn blue every 100 Halloweens. He first appears in "A Berry Scary Night" where he tries to hypnotize the Pac-Worlders into finding Pac-Man under Betrayus's orders, but he also begins hypnotizing some of the ghosts as well since he is on neither side. Count Pacula has a weakness to the Garlic Berry. In "Pac's Very Scary Halloween", he is Dr. Pacenstein's neighbor but doesn't enjoy being near him. He later helps Cyli and Spiral return Pac's brain to his body after Dr. Pacenstein transfers his brain inside it. His and Pac's brain were briefly transferred and were later switched back. Like the version that was seen in the 80s' Pac-Man cartoon, Count Pacula is a spoof of Count Dracula.
 Jean (voiced by Nicole Oliver) is a vile genie who first appeared in "Meanie Genie". Dr. Buttocks found her bottle and tricked Pac-Man into finding it and releasing her. After granting Pac-Man three wishes that ends up putting the ghosts on Pac-World yet keeping them from re-entering the Netherworld, she traps Pac-Man in her bottle just before she and the ghosts proceed to wreak havoc. After Sir Cumference frees Pac-Man, he fights Jean using a Wizard Berry and traps her back in her bottle (as well as undoing what she has done to the city and sending the ghosts back to the Netherworld). Pac-Man and Sir Cumference then place Jean's bottle into a rocket and launched it into space. Unbeknownst to Pac-Man and Sir Cumference, the rocket containing Jean's bottle is found by a Pointy Head spaceship.
 Overlords of the Outer Regions are a group of strange and unknown celestial beings that take the form of a burst of light and first appeared in "Cosmic Contest". They were frustrated and annoyed with the Pac-People, Ghosts, and Pointy Heads fighting each other and disturbing them and decide to settle things by having two of each race against each other in which the winners can stay but the other two teams will be banished to a world of nothingness that will be far far away from their homeworlds. Because the contest ended in a tie, no one is banished by the Overlords. Before leaving, the Overlords did warn them that if they cause a ruckus again they will annihilate them all, but also leaving without helping anyone return to their homes. Before the race started, the Overlords quietly said that if Pac-Man were to reach his full potential, he could challenge even them.
 Mooby is an ancient giant flying Pac-Cow that lives up in the sky in Pac-World.
 The Easter Pac-Peep (voiced by Ashleigh Ball) is a humanoid marshmallow chicken made of marshmallow and the owner of Easter Egg Island who first appears in "Easter Egg Island". She became hostile and bad-tempered due to Betrayus' past pranks and has kidnapped his ghosts. Pac-Man and his friends helped Betrayus rescue them and talk some sense into the chicken, turning her kind and good-hearted again by showing the family album of Cylindria with a picture of Cylindria and her family holding an Easter basket. She's a parody of the Easter Bunny, though the only difference is that she's a hen instead of a rabbit.
 Dentures of Doom (voiced by Paul Dobson) are a set of living dentures originally owned by an ancient mummy wizard who accidentally brings it to life and turns it evil. As a result, it was locked away due to its dangerous power. Many years later Pac-Man and his friends find it and it possesses Pac-Man and Buttocks in order to return to their owner. But before it can do so, Pac-Man and Grinder get in the way and return them to normal.
 Mummy Wizard (voiced by Paul Dobson) is a strange humanoid wizard with a mummy-like appearance. After bringing his dentures to life and turning them evil, he was separated from them. Many years later, he and his dentures trying to reunite but Pac-Man and Grinder interfere and turn them back to normal before giving them back, this led the wizard into becoming a good wizard. He made cameo appearances in "Pac's Very Scary Halloween".
 Round Deer are flying reindeer that pull Santa Pac's sled and have special fighting abilities.
 Rounddolf is the leading round deer with a glowing yellow nose. He's a spoof of Rudolph the Red-Nosed Reindeer.
 Dr. Pacenstein is the talking brain in the glass and lives in Transylpacia Castle which is next to Count Pacula's castle (although he and Count Pacula don't get along well). He was originally a Pac-Person and a quack scientist until being shunned by the villagers and sacrificed his body for experiments. He made a deal with Betrayus and lured Pac-Man and his friends to his castle to transfer his brain inside Pac's body and Pac's brain into his jar. Dr. Pacentstein double-crosses Betrayus and begins wreaking havoc until being defeated by Pac-Man (in Count Pacula's body). After Pac's brain is returned to his body, Dr. Pacenstein's brain ends up in a slug's body. He is a spoof of Victor Frankenstein.
 Eeghost is a silent white ghost in a hood. He is Dr. Pacenstein's sidekick. Eeghost is a spoof of Igor.
 Limbs are Dr. Pacenstein's hands and feet who appear to have been given minds of their own after Dr. Pacenstein sacrificed his body. They usually annoy him.

Monsters 
 Fluffy is a giant poodle. Although it may sound sweet, when it is angered, it will turn violent. This Poodle lookalike has three heads like a Cerberus. When they are actually nice, the middle one has a soft side and sends get-well cards to his victims. Pinky is usually the one to bribe Fluffy when Pac-Man needs to pass by.
 Fuzbitz (voiced by Lee Tockar) is Sir Cumference's pet monster. He has a similar appetite to Pac. When angry, he turns into a more ferocious version of himself. Despite this ability, Betrayus and Dr. Buttocks thought he was useless back when Fuzbitz lived in the Netherworld. He now lives with Sir Cumference in his lab after proving that he was too much for Pac-man and his friends to handle. He sometimes annoys Grinder.
 Gargoyles are large, heavy-set blue monsters with three eyes and small wings.
 Slug-cams are used by Betrayus to spy on Pac-World.
 Larry is one slug who is friends with the Ghost Gang.
 Pac-Dragons are one-eyed red dragons that live in the Netherworld.
 Stalkers is a black medium-sized monster with 2 legs, a long eel-like body, and a multi-eyed face full of sharp teeth. Despite its ferocious appearance, it's actually quite wimpy.
 Venus Dragon Flytraps are large carnivorous plants that are indigenous to the Netherworld.
 Monobats are a race of one-eyed bats.
 Stone Temple Guardians are giant statues that serve as the guardians of a slime-filled temple.
 Pacosaurus refers to a type of ancient dinosaur which originally roamed Pac-World, appearing in "Jurassic Pac" and "Cave Pac-Man".
 Were-Pac Flea is a Netherworld flea made by Dr. Buttocks. It was given the ability to turn Pac-People, Ghosts or Pac-Wolves into Were-Pacs (the Pac-People version of werewolves). The effects will wear off when it leaves its host. It only appears in "The Shadow of the Were-Pac" where it tries to turn all the Pac-People into Were-Pacs including Pac-Man and his friends.
 Space Worm is a giant worm that lives in space and has the ability to send victims to other dimensions. Pac-Man's first encounter with it caused him to be transported to the future, which is then revealed to be a dream. It made a cameo appearance in "Cap'n Banshee and his Interstellar Buccaneers". Buttocks later tried to use its powers to his advantage and sends Pac-Man to an alternate dimension of Pac-World, but it proves to be too powerful. Pac-Man later returns from the alternate dimension and repels it from Pac-World.
 Hugefoot is a monster with an enormous foot. It is revealed to be a female and falls in love with Pac-Man.
 Chocolate Bunnies appear in "Easter Egg Island" and they are scientists and travelers who are turned into those Chocolate-flavoured beasts and are controlled by the Easter Pac-Peep. Cyli and her family (and Betrayus) are later turned into chocolate bunnies while finding Betrayus's ghosts but are eventually returned to normal by Pac-Man, except for Betrayus.
 Were-Pacs are Pac-Worlds versions of werewolves who appear in "The Shadow of the Were-Pac" (who are actually Pac-People turned into Were-Pacs by the Were-Pac Flea) and "Pac's Very Scary Halloween".
 Pac-Mammoths are creatures who originally roamed Pac-World like the Pacosaurus. A Pac-Mammoth made a cameo appearance in "Pac's Very Scary Halloween" while they mostly appeared in the video game Pac-Man and the Ghostly Adventures 2.

Music 
The "Pac is Back" theme song features sound effects and melodies from the original arcade game, and other pieces of music from older Pac-Man games are remixed and used in the show. Some action sequences feature a remix of "Pac-Man's Park" from Pac-Mania (Which itself is based of the cutscene theme from the original Pac-Man arcade game). This remix also featured in the mobile game Pac-Man Dash!.

Meanwhile, the Japanese dub of the show has a different theme song named "PAC THIS WORLD!!!" by Kenichi Maeyamada, (aka, Hyadain)

Episodes

Crew 
 Avi Arad – Developer & Executive Producer
 Sean Catherine Derek – Story Editor
 David Earl – Storyboard Artist
 Tetsuya Ishii – Lead Character Designer
 Terry Klassen – Voice Director (ep. 3–present)
 Masashi Kobayashi – Line Producer
 Tatsuro Maruyama – Art Director
 Masafumi Mima – Sound Director
 Tom Ruegger – Developer, Writer
 Paul Rugg – Developer, Writer
 Kris Zimmerman – Voice Director (ep. 1–2)

Development 
The series was tentatively called Pac-Man 3D and later Pac-Man: The Adventure Begins. On September 26, 2011, 41 Entertainment was named worldwide distributor for the series and that the series would be finished for a Fall 2013 window.

Merchandise 
41 Entertainment signed many deals for merchandising, including a fast food deal with Burger King, a building toy license with K'nex excluding Japan,

Broadcast

United States
On February 29, 2012, 41 named Disney XD as the US broadcaster for the series. The series debuted on June 15, 2013, and aired on the network until 2016.

On July 1, 2017, reruns of the series began broadcasting on the KidsClick block as one of its launch programmes, and aired on the block until it's discontinuation in March 2019.

On July 7, 2019, Discovery Family picked up rights to several of 41 Entertainment's shows, including Pac-Man and the Ghostly Adventures. The show premiered on the channel on November 16, 2019.

Japan
The series premiered on April 5, 2014, on Tokyo MX and BS11 in Japan, and is being produced by Avi Arad.

Canada
The series premiered on March 17, 2014, on Disney XD Canada, and was retained following the network's rebrand as Family Chargd on October 9, 2015.

Internationally
On June 26, 2012, British Sky Broadcasting acquired the 2D and 3D broadcast rights for the series in the United Kingdom. On November 15, 2013, the 2D rights transitioned from Sky to Disney XD and later premiered on the network on January 11, 2014. Sky 3D would air the series within the same time as well.

In October 2012, it was confirmed that Network Ten would air the series in Australia.

On February 7, 2013, Clan and Canal Panda picked up the free and pay-TV rights to the series in Spain for a summer 2013 window on the latter and a January 2014 window for the former. The series premiered on Clan on January 16, 2014.

On March 29, 2013, CTC acquired the free-TV rights for the series in Russia.

On September 10, 2013, Gulli and Canal J picked up the free and pay-TV rights to the series in France for a Fall 2013 window.

On September 17, 2013, MBC3 picked up the rights for select MENA regions.

On November 15, 2013, 41 granted Disney EMEA various TV rights for the series. Disney XD acquired the Pay-TV rights for Series 1 in the United Kingdom, Ireland and Nordic territories with an option for the second series if needed, while Disney XD and Disney Channel acquired the pay and free-TV rights to both seasons in Germany.

In the Philippines, it aired on Disney Channel on March 3 and ended on October 30, 2014, to give way for the special programming of "Monstober". It returned to air on March 2, 2015.

On October 5, 2015, the series premiered on Discovery Kids in Latin America (except Brazil, which aired on Gloob instead).

DVD releases

North America
On February 7, 2013, 41 Entertainment appointed Phase 4 Films as North American Home Entertainment distributor for the series.

The first release - "The Adventure Begins" was released on January 7, 2014, and solely contained the first episode of the series.

These releases were followed on with volumed DVDs containing four episodes each: "Pac is Back!" (Released in January 2014), "All You Can Eat" (Released in January 2014), "Ghost Patrol" (Released in March 2014), "Let the Games Begin", and "A Berry Scary Night" (Released in September 2014), "Jurassic Pac", "Movie 4-Pac" and a collection containing four or eight DVDs were also followed up.

There were also two DVDs each with three episodes that was released exclusively to Redbox: "Indiana Pac and the Temple of Slime", and "Mission Impacable!". An additional release: "Pac to the Future", was exclusively sold at Redbox Canada.

Australian releases 
There have been two DVD releases in Australia. These were released in Australia on October 2, 2013. The current releases in Australia are:
 Pac-Man and the Ghostly Adventures: The Adventure Begins, the first DVD release containing the first 6 episodes
 Pac-Man and the Ghostly Adventures: Pac to the Future, which contains another 6 episodes.

German releases 
On May 1, 2014, 41 Entertainment named Universal Studios Home Entertainment as the distributor for the series in the country.

The first six volumes were released on October 10, 2014., with volumes seven and eight releasing on March 15, 2015. Each DVD contained two episodes from the series with only German audio.

Japan
11 DVDs of the series were released for rental by Bandai Visual between 2014-2015, each containing five episodes.

Video games 
Several video games based on the show have been developed. An endless runner for iOS and Android titled Pac-Man Dash! was released in July 2013. This is also hosted for free in Canada on the CHRGD website. In 2017, Pac-Man Dash! was discontinued and removed from digital storefronts.

A 3D platformer with the same name as the TV series was released for Wii U, PlayStation 3, Xbox 360, and Windows PC in late 2013, accompanied by a 2D platformer for the Nintendo 3DS shortly after. A sequel was released in October 2014. Characters from the show have also appeared in the compilation release for PlayStation 3, Xbox 360, and Windows PC, titled Pac-Man Museum. The compilation was delisted in 2020.

Although the show's Pac-Man design was the standard at the time, Pac-Man's original design would appear in Super Smash Bros. for Nintendo 3DS and Wii U instead. Super Smash Bros. series creator Masahiro Sakurai stated that he preferred the original design of Pac-Man over the design seen in The Ghostly Adventures, and would have considered dropping him from the game if Bandai Namco didn't let him use the classic design.

Notes

References

External links 
 
 Production website 
 
 
 
 Pac-Man and the Ghostly Adventures at Behind the Voice Actors
 Japanese website

Pac-Man
2010s American animated television series
2010s American comic science fiction television series
2010s American high school television series
2013 American television series debuts
2015 American television series endings
2010s Canadian animated television series
2010s Canadian comic science fiction television series
2010s Canadian high school television series
2013 Canadian television series debuts
2015 Canadian television series endings
2013 anime television series debuts
2013 Japanese television series debuts
2015 Japanese television series endings
Bandai Namco franchises
American children's animated action television series
American children's animated space adventure television series
American children's animated drama television series
American children's animated science fantasy television series
American children's animated comic science fiction television series
Canadian children's animated action television series
Canadian children's animated space adventure television series
Canadian children's animated drama television series
Canadian children's animated science fantasy television series
Canadian children's animated comic science fiction television series
Japanese children's animated action television series
Japanese children's animated space adventure television series
Japanese children's animated science fantasy television series
Japanese children's animated comic science fiction television series
American computer-animated television series
Canadian computer-animated television series
Japanese computer-animated television series
Japanese high school television series
English-language television shows
Disney XD original programming
Animated series based on video games
Animated television series about ghosts
OLM, Inc.
Television series about size change
Works based on Bandai Namco video games
KidsClick
Television series created by Tom Ruegger
Television series set on fictional planets
American television shows based on video games
Canadian television shows based on video games
Teen animated television series